Wide Angles is an album by saxophonist Michael Brecker that won the Grammy Award for Best Large Jazz Ensemble Album in 2004.

Track listing

Personnel

Musicians
 Michael Brecker – tenor saxophone, arranger
 John Patitucci – bass
 Adam Rogers – guitar
 Antonio Sánchez – drums
 Robin Eubanks – trombone
 Alex Sipiagin – trumpet
 Charles Pillow – English horn, oboe
 Peter Gordon – French horn
 Steve Wilson – alto flute
 Iain Dixon – bass clarinet
 Joyce Hammann – violin
 Mark Feldman – violin, concert master
 Lois Martin – viola
 Erik Friedlander – cello
 Daniel Sadownick – percussion

Production
 Gil Goldstein – arranger, conductor, producer, orchestration
 Brian Dozoretz – assistant engineer
 Jay Newland – engineer, mixing
 Greg Calbi – mastering
 George Whitty – digital editing
 Nicole Hegeman – production coordination
 Darryl Pitt – production coordination
 Tommy Wilson – production coordination

References 

2003 albums
Michael Brecker albums
Verve Records albums
Grammy Award for Best Large Jazz Ensemble Album